Prevera  is one of 12 parishes (administrative divisions) in Carreño, a municipality within the province and autonomous community of Asturias, in northern Spain.

The postal code is 33492.

Villages and hamlets
 La Baragaña
 La Barquera
 Barreres
 La Cuesta
 L'Empalme
 Mazaneda
 El Monte
 Muniello
 Reconco
 El Riigu
 El Valle
 Xelaz

References 

Parishes in Carreño